Gymnobela petiti is a species of sea snail, a marine gastropod mollusk in the family Raphitomidae.

Description
The length of the shell attains 15 mm.

Distribution
G. petiti can be found in Caribbean waters, off the western coast of Dry Tortugas.

References

External links
  García E.F. 2005. Six new deep-water molluscan species (Gastropoda: Epitoniidae, Conoidea) from the Gulf of Mexico. Novapex, 6(4): 79-87
  Rosenberg, G.; Moretzsohn, F.; García, E. F. (2009). Gastropoda (Mollusca) of the Gulf of Mexico, Pp. 579–699 in: Felder, D.L. and D.K. Camp (eds.), Gulf of Mexico–Origins, Waters, and Biota. Texas A&M Press, College Station, Texas
 Gastropods.com: Gymnobela petiti

petiti
Gastropods described in 2005